Hell's Wind Staff (released in the United Kingdom as Hell'z Windstaff or also known as The Dragon and the Tiger Kids.) is a 1979 Hong Kong martial arts film directed by Lu Chin-ku, and also written, produced, storied and directed by Tony Wong based in edition of a comic book 龍虎門 made in hong kong, starring Hwang Jang Lee, Meng Yuen-man, Mang Hoi and Kwan Yung-moon.

Plot
Two young kung fu experts are terrorized by an evil warlord whose weapon is known as the Hell's Wind Staff. With the aid of an old rival of the warlord, they train in the Dragon Hands and the Rowing Oar to face off against the deadly Hell's Wind Staff.

Cast
Hwang Jang Lee – Lu Shan-tu
Meng Yuen-man – Tiger Wang
Mang Hoi – Stone Dragon
Kwan Yung-moon – Shek
Jason Pai Piao – Ching Wan-li
Yip Fei-yang – Tiao Erh
Lau Hok-nin – Master Wang Fu-hu
Baan Yun-sang – Snake Fighter
Wong Mei – Master Liu Chia-wen
Hsu Hsia – Cousin Hsu
Cheung Hei – Older Fisherman #1
Chui Fat – Beats Up Unwilling Fishermen
Gam Tin-chue – Older Fisherman #2
Ho Kei-chong
Kei Ho-chiu
Lee Chu-hwa – Muscles
Lin Ke-ming
Lo Wai – Hsu's Student
Tai San – Recruits Fishermen
Wang Han-chen – Uncle Fu
Yeung Sai-gwan

Action choreographers
Hsu Hsia
Corey Yuen
Chin Yuet-sang
Yuen Shun-yee

DVD release
DVD was released in Region 2 in the United Kingdom on 24 February 2003, it was distributed by Eastern Heroes.
In the US it was released on DVD by Xenon Video (2003) in 2.35:1 ratio, original language (Cantonese with Chinese and English subtitles burned in), the ending where you see the bad guy get shoved into a tree stump and his legs yanked apart like a wishbone, is truncated. The World Video release (2001) is full screen, English dubbed and it features the full ending.

External links
 

1979 films
1979 martial arts films
1970s Cantonese-language films
Hong Kong films about revenge
Hong Kong martial arts films
Kung fu films
Rape and revenge films
1970s Hong Kong films